CCU is a Chilean producer of diversified beverages founded in 1902. The company produces both alcoholic and non-alcoholic beverages, also operating in the food sector. They have operations in Chile, Argentina, Bolivia, Colombia, Paraguay, Uruguay and Peru.

CCU is notably far from obscurity in South America and is somewhat diverse. It is Chile's largest brewer, the second largest soft drink producer, the second largest wine producer, the largest bottler of mineral water and fruit-based beverages in Chile, one of the largest pisco producers in the region, and it participates in the candy manufacturing business. CCU is the second-largest brewer in Argentina and also participates in the cider, spirits and wine industries. In Uruguay and Paraguay, the Company is present in the beer, mineral and bottled water, soft drinks and fruit-based beverage categories. In Bolivia, CCU participates in the beer, water, soft drinks and malt beverage categories. In Colombia, the Company participates in the beer industry and in Peru, in the pisco industry.

The CCU product portfolio includes its own brands, as well as licensed and imported brands, maintaining licensing agreements and / or joint ventures with Heineken International N.V., Anheuser-Busch Inc. (now a wholly owned subsidiary of Anheuser-Busch InBev N.V.), PepsiCo Inc., Paulaner Brewery GmbH & Co. KG, (Brau Holding International GmbH & Co. KGaA) Dr Pepper Snapple Group Inc. (formerly Cadbury Schweppes), Guinness Brewery (a subsidiary of Diageo Plc), and Societe des Produits Nestlé S.A..

In 1957, the first digital computer arrived in Chile after the CCU purchased a Univac to be delivered to Valparaiso. The machine was one of the first documented cases in the history of computer science in South America.

References

Companies listed on the Santiago Stock Exchange
Companies listed on the New York Stock Exchange
Food and drink companies of Chile
1902 establishments in Chile
Beer in Chile
Manufacturing companies based in Santiago
PepsiCo bottlers
Companies established in 1902